Santa Maria Nuova is a comune (municipality) in the Province of Ancona in the Italian region Marche, located about  southwest of Ancona.

Santa Maria Nuova borders the following municipalities: Filottrano, Jesi, Osimo, Polverigi.

Among the churches in the city is the 18th-century church of San Giuseppe and the church of Sant'Antonio di Padova.

References

Cities and towns in the Marche